Kankakee Airport  is a privately owned, public use airport located three nautical miles (6 km) southwest of the central business district of Kankakee, a city in Kankakee County, Illinois, United States.

Facilities and aircraft 
Kankakee Airport covers an area of 280 acres (113 ha) at an elevation of 625 feet (190 m) above mean sea level. It has two runways with turf surfaces: 9/27 is 2,644 by 300 feet (806 x 91 m) and 18/36 is 2,564 by 200 feet (782 x 61 m).

For the 12-month period ending July 31, 2018, the airport had an average of 36 aircraft operations per day, or just over 13,000 total. All were general aviation. At that time there were 45 aircraft based at this airport: 35 single-engine, 6 ultralight, and 4 multi-engine.

See also 
 Greater Kankakee Airport (FAA: IKK), located at

References

External links 

 Aerial image as of March 1999 from USGS The National Map

Airports in Illinois
Buildings and structures in Kankakee County, Illinois